Babongo is a linear settlement in Mbéré, Adamawa Region, Cameroon. It is located on the N1 (Meiganga-Ngaoundéré) road, between the villages of Garga and Manbaka, about an hour and forty minutes' drive from Ngaoundéré.

Geography and climate 
The village is located on a flat plain at an altitude of 1129 metres above sea level. The soil is mostly orange in colour, with black areas and very few rocks. The vegetation is a mixture of savannah, thickets and a denser forest The climate is temperate. The first rains occur in mid-April and they end in mid-September.

History 
The village of Babongo developed from an intersection which linked Belel to Meiganga by an unpathed road without passing through Ngaoundéré. It has expanded as a result of the proximity of high tension power pylons and posts for a fibre optic cable, which have enabled the village to be electrified and encouraged the formerly nomadic population to adopt sedentarism.

Administration and politics 
Babongo is administered by a traditional chief of the second degree. The CPDM, NUDP, and other political parties are active in the village.

Demographics 
The population of Babongo exceeded 350 inhabitants in 2015, settled in an area of more than 2 km.2 There is a primary school with four classrooms in three levels (Sil-CP; CE1-CE2; CM1-CM2). Further education has to be undertaken at the village of Garga, which has a secondary school. There is also a district office for health, well-digging, and drinking water.

The inhabitants of Babongo are Muslim and Christian. The mosque is located next to the chief's house and there is a small chapel for the Christians.

The main ethnic groups in the village are Fulani, Mbéré, Mbum, and Gbaya. They practice both agriculture and pastoralism.

Economy and transport 
The local economy is based on the sale of livestock, agriculture and the informal economy. Transport is mostly by motorcycle, private car, or hitchhiking with cars travelling along the Meiganga-Ngaoundéré road.

References 

Populated places in Adamawa Region